Pawpaw soup is a popular delicacy of one of the Tiv ethnic group of Nigeria, the soup is made up of dry pawpaw flakes, palm oil, beef and egusi.

Origin 
The soup is common to the Tiv tribe of Benue state whose slogan is "Food basket of the Nation".

Overview 
Beef is fried and after which the stock from it is added to a pot alongside palm oil, egusi,onion and seasoning cubes. The soup is allowed to cook for few minutes after which the unripe pawpaw flakes are added.

Other foods 
Pawpaw soup is best taken with swallows such as pounded yam, fufu, eba and semovita

See also 
 Jamaican cuisine
 List of soups
 Mountain papaya

References 

Fruit soups
Nigerian soups